Parliament House in Brisbane is the meeting place of the Parliament of Queensland, housing its only chamber, the Legislative Assembly. It is located on the corner of George Street and Alice Street at Gardens Point in the CBD, and is next to the Queensland University of Technology and City Botanic Gardens.

History

Planning
The Parliament of Queensland first met on 22 May 1860 in the former convict barracks on Queen Street. The building was not considered a suitable meeting place for Parliament in the long-term, but the government was preoccupied with the construction of Government House, and plans for a new legislative facility were not made until after its completion. In November 1863 a commission chose the site for the new parliamentary building on the corner of Alice and George Street. The commission soon opened an Australia-wide competition for the new building's design, and offered a 200 guinea prize for the winning submission. In April 1864, a design by Benjamin Backhouse was selected, but was later rejected after it was estimated that it would require  to construct, exceeding the maximum cost of  specified in the competition. In October 1864, a design by William Henry Ellerker was recommended by the Parliamentary Commissioners. However in November 1865, the commissioners withdrew their recommendation and resigned, following criticism by James Cowlishaw who claimed none of the submissions was satisfactory. In December 1864, Ellerker wrote a public complaint about the process, but ultimately plans by Charles Tiffin, the Queensland Colonial Architect, were selected. Amid controversy and allegations of undue influence on the outcome of the competition, Tiffin donated his prize money for the design to the Ipswich Grammar School.

Construction

On 14 July 1865 the foundation stone for the building was laid by Sir George Bowen. It was built by Joshua Jeays who used sandstone from his own quarries. Stained glass windows depicting royalty were imported from Birmingham. The first section was completed in 1867. The George Street frontage was completed in 1868 in French Renaissance Revival style, with some Second Empire-style elements. The archways and colonnades facing George Street were built in 1878, and construction on the Alice Street frontage commenced in 1887. The Alice Street wing was completed in 1889.

In 1886 Parliament House was connected to the Government Printing Office via an underground cable which provided it with electricity. The building was the first Parliament House in Australia to be electrified.

20th century
In March 1939, the Speaker of the Legislative Assembly George Pollock committed suicide at his office in Parliament House by shooting himself with a shotgun.

Led by George Gray, in August 1939 members of the League for Social Justice marched on Parliament House to protest unemployment, "armed with batons, coils of barbed wire and hammers". They interrupted a meeting of the ALP caucus in the old Legislative Council chambers. Gray and 36 others were charged with unlawful assembly, but were acquitted by a sympathetic jury.

In 1969 the Government began to investigate the feasibility and cost of an extension to Parliament House. Three years later the State Works Department and Parliamentary Buildings Committee began planning the building, and designed a brutalist extension called the Parliamentary Annexe. Tenders for the Annexe were called in August 1975, and construction began soon after.

The Annexe was completed in March 1979 at a cost of $20,000,000. The building is linked to Parliament House, forming a square like the one in Tiffin's original 1864 plan. The square has become known as Speaker's Green and is used for ceremonial purposes.

The Annexe was refurbished in 2000.

Design

The George Street face of Parliament House has a porte-cochère, with a balustraded terrace above. The original zinc roof was replaced in the 1980s with one constructed from Mount Isa copper.

Public use
Art exhibitions and other displays are frequently staged in the spacious ground floor areas of the Annexe.

Free public guided tours of the Parliament are available each week day. Also, a gift shop, selling souvenirs and memorabilia, is located in the main foyer.

Parliament House was also used as one of the filming locations for the 1980s Australian series of Mission: Impossible.

Parliament House was used as a filming location for the 2022 TV series 'Joe vs Carole'.

See also

Government of Queensland
History of Queensland

References

External links

Parliament of Queensland website
Parliament House Discover Queensland Buildings website

Parliament of Queensland
Tourist attractions in Brisbane
Buildings and structures in Brisbane
Legislative buildings in Australia
Second Empire architecture in Australia
Government buildings completed in 1867
Landmarks in Brisbane
1867 establishments in Australia
Charles Tiffin buildings
Heritage of Brisbane
Government buildings in Queensland
Alice Street, Brisbane
George Street, Brisbane
Queensland Heritage Register